The 2008 United States House of Representatives election in South Dakota took place on Tuesday, November 4, 2008. Voters selected a representative for their single At-Large district, who ran on a statewide ballot.

Democratic incumbent Stephanie Herseth Sandlin was challenged by the Republican nominee, businessman and attorney Chris Lien. Neither candidate was opposed in the June 3, 2008 primary. CQ Politics forecasted this race as 'Safe Democrat'. George W. Bush won in this district 60% to 38% for John Kerry in 2004. As of 2022, this election, along with the simultaneous Senate race, is the last time a Democrat won a statewide election in South Dakota. This also the last time either party won every county in the state in a contested race.

Election results

See also
 South Dakota's at-large congressional district

References

External links
Elections from the South Dakota Secretary of State
U.S. Congress candidates for South Dakota at Project Vote Smart
South Dakota U.S. House Races from 2008 Race Tracker
Campaign contributions for South Dakota congressional races from OpenSecrets
Campaign contributions from OpenSecrets
Campaign websites (Archived)
Stephanie Herseth Sandlin for Congress
Chris Lien for Congress

United States House of Representatives
South Dakota
2008